Air Force United Football Club was a Thai professional football club based in Lam Luk Ka, Pathum Thani province. Defunct after 2019 season, The club was renamed to Uthai Thani F.C. and relocated it to Uthai Thani province. The team formed the football section of the Royal Thai Air Force until 2019.

History

Historically, Air Force United had been one of the most successful Thai football clubs. However, since the turn of the century, they hadn't achieved much success. The last silverware they won was the FA Cup back in 2001.
Air Force hadn't played in the topflight of Thai football since 2004.

In 2010 Thai Division 1 League, the season started off brightly for the Airmen, and by the midway point they were strong candidates for promotion. In the second half of the season, they lost form and finished in 6th spot for the second consecutive season.

The 2011 & 2012 seasons both saw Air Force United flirting with relegation before they eventually finished in mid-table. The club had to relocate to Ramkhamheang University for the latter stages of the 2011 season because their stadium was flooded due to the 2011 Thailand floods. Despite returning home for the first half of the 2012 season, the club played the second leg of the campaign at North Bangkok University while their ground was being renovated.

In the 2013 season under the stewardship of club legend Narasak Boonkleng, the team started out with two 1 goal victories followed by a frustrating 4 straight goalless draws which had the making of a long tough season. But the Airmen had a nine-game winning streak with 1 goal victories, which put the Air Force United in prime position to win promotion back to the Premier League after 10 years' absence. The 2nd Leg saw them struggle a bit, but they regrouped to pull off a series of wins to gain promotion and win the league in subsequent home games.

The 2014 season start was just a total nightmare unable to win the first twelve games until the 2–1 away victory at Singhtarua.  Despite showing some sign of improvement, the club management decided to part ways with head coach Narasak Boonkleng.  The club's fortunes did not improve with a seven-game winless streak followed by a nine-game winless streak to end the season and relegated back to League 1 after just one season.

The 2015 season started with Sasom Pobprasert as full-time head coach, but it started poorly with one draw and two losses in the first three games.  The next four games saw massive improvement with 2 wins and 1 draw pulling out of relegation and into 13th place before the Songkran (Thai New Year's) break. Another chance to show that the team had settled down was when they hosted Navy FC of Premier League in the 1st Round of the 2015 Toyota League Cup, but the team took a 1–0 lead into injury time and gave up 2 goals to be eliminated from the cup.  Since being eliminated from the League Cup, the team had a 6-game unbeaten streak with 4 wins and 2 draws placing them at 3rd place in the table right before the league went on a 40-day break for the 2015 Southeast Asian Games in Singapore.

Renaming and relocation to Uthai Thani 
At the end of season 2019, the club owner decided to change the club name to Uthai Thani and relocated to Uthai Thani Province.

Stadium and locations

Season-by-season record

P = Played
W = Games won
D = Games drawn
L = Games lost
F = Goals for
A = Goals against
Pts = Points
Pos = Final position
N/A = No answer

TPL = Thai Premier League

DQ = Disqualified
QR1 = First Qualifying Round
QR2 = Second Qualifying Round
QR3 = Third Qualifying Round
QR4 = Fourth Qualifying Round
RInt = Intermediate Round
R1 = Round 1
R2 = Round 2
R3 = Round 3

R4 = Round 4
R5 = Round 5
R6 = Round 6
GR = Group stage
QF = Quarter-finals
SF = Semi-finals
RU = Runners-up
S = Shared
W = Winners

Achievements

Domestic

League
 Thai League 1: 2 titles
1997, 1999

 Thai League 2: 1 titles
 2013

 Khǒr Royal Cup (Tier 2 when contested): 16 titles
1949-51, 1961, 1962, 1964, 1965, 1967, 1973, 1977, 1982, 1985–87, 1989, 1991

 Khor Royal Cup (Tier 5 when contested): 8 titles
1966, 1970, 1971, 1983, 1985–87, 1990

 Ngor Royal Cup (tier 6 when contested): 4 titles
1966, 1984, 1986, 1988

Cups
 Queen's Cup: 3 titles
1970, 1974, 1982

 FA Cup: 1 titles
1996

 League Cup: 2 titles
1987, 1994

 Kor Royal Cup: 12 titles
1952, 1953, 1957, 1958, 1959, 1960, 1961, 1962, 1963, 1967, 1987, 1996

Performance in AFC competitions

Notes

 Royal Thai Air Force withdrew to Semi-final League round.

References

External links
 Club official website
 Official Facebook

 
Association football clubs established in 1937
Football clubs in Thailand
Royal Thai Air Force
1937 establishments in Siam
Military association football clubs in Thailand
Defunct football clubs in Thailand